Six teams, four from West Asia and two from East Asia, competed in the 2011 AFC Champions League qualifying play-off.

The draw for the qualifying play-off was held in Kuala Lumpur, Malaysia on 7 December 2010. In order to create balance another draw was held, moving one of the teams (Al-Ain) from the West into the East side of the play-offs.

Both the semi-finals and finals were played in one match, hosted by one of the teams. Extra time and penalty shootout are used to decide the winner if necessary. The semi-finals were played 12 February 2011, and the finals were played 19 February 2011.

The two winners from the qualifying play-off, one from West Asia and one from East Asia, advanced to the group stage to join the 30 automatic qualifiers. All losers from the qualifying play-off entered the 2011 AFC Cup group stage.

Matches

West Asia

!colspan="3"|Semi-final

|-
!colspan="3"|Final

|}

Semi-final

Final

East Asia

!colspan="3"|Semi-final

|-
!colspan="3"|Final

|}

Semi-final

Final

References

External links
AFC Champions League Official Page 

Qualifying play-off